Berretti is an Italian surname, may refer to:
 Dante Berretti (1897–1965), Italian football manager and vice-president of FIGC
 Maicol Berretti (born 1989), Sammarinese footballer
 Matteo Berretti (born 1985), Italian footballer

Other
 Campionato Nazionale Dante Berretti, youth tournament named after Berretti.

Italian-language surnames